Palais Glacier is a broad glacier, about 8 nautical miles (15 km) long, flowing north between Wilkniss Mountains and Colwell Massif to enter Ferrar Glacier, in Victoria Land. Named by Advisory Committee on Antarctic Names (US-ACAN) in 1994 after Julie Michelle Palais, glaciologist, who conducted field research in Antarctica during five seasons at Dome Charlie and Mount Erebus, 1978–89; from 1991, Program Director for Polar Glaciology, Office of Polar Programs, National Science Foundation (NSF); from 1994, member of the U.S. Advisory Committee on Antarctic Names.

Glaciers of Victoria Land
Scott Coast